Shishou is a county-level city under the administration of the prefectural-level city Jingzhou, in the south of Hubei province, near its border with Hunan province, and is located in the middle reaches of the Yangtze River. The Swan Islet Wetland of the  Yangtze River in this area is the world's largest national natural reserve both for wild elks(Milu, or David Deer) and for Chinese river dolphins (finless porpoises). The Shishou City National Baiji Reserve for Chinese river dolphins is nearby. It shares its name with a stream flowing into the Yangtze River. Moreover, Shishou boasts a diversified landscape, including mountains, hills, lakes, rivers, terraces and plains, as well as abundant resources such as rice, cotton, oil plants, eggs, fish, and lotus roots.

Geography

Shishou is in a subtropical monsoon climate zone with an abundant amount of light and heat energy and a long frost-free period. The city receives 1800–2000 hours of sunshine annually, with an annual average temperature of 15.9-16.6 ℃, 10 ℃ or higher accumulated temperature annually, an annual frost-free period of 242–263 days, and an average annual precipitation between 1100mm and 1300 mm. The climatic resources are sufficient for a large variety of crops to grow. Because of the climatic condition of  hydro-thermal synchronization during agricultural production seasons, Shishou provides the optimal climate to grow a variety of crops between April and October (80% of the annual precipitation, 75% of annual solar radiation, and 80% of annual accumulated temperature that is greater than 10 ℃). The climate is particularly complex in the vicinity of 30 degrees north latitude. Situated far in the Inland, Shishou's climate is minimally affected by the sea, which contributes to its typical continental climate.

Climate

Administration 
The city of Shishou has direct jurisdiction over 2 subdistricts, 11 towns, 1 townships, and 1 economic and technological development zone:

2009 Shishou incident

In June 2009, Shishou was rocked by violent protest after a man, Tu Yuangao, was found dead, supposedly due to suicide, outside the Yonglong hotel. The hotel is owned by a relative of Shishou's mayor. Tu, 24, was the hotel's chef. Fearing a cover-up, Tu's family refused to accept that his death was a suicide, and guarded his body while awaiting investigation. When police tried to forcefully remove Tu's body, local residents joined Tu's family, blocking the hotel entrance from the police. On June 19 a large number of local residents guarded the hotel, fighting with the police, including armed police. Confrontations between the police and residents continued outside the hotel, and on June 20, the municipal government began cutting internet connections in Shishou. On June 21, the police managed to break through the crowd and took Tu's corpse to a crematorium, apparently without giving the family the investigation it had requested.

References

External links
Government website (in Chinese)
Straits Times Article
Google document (Chinese) compiling information on the Shishou riots from tweets of local residents

Cities in Hubei
County-level divisions of Hubei
Populated places on the Yangtze River
Jingzhou